Matúš Marcin (born 6 April 1994) is a Slovak professional footballer who currently plays for Zemplín Michalovce of the Fortuna Liga.

Club career

Tatran Prešov
Marcin made his official debut for Tatran Prešov on 5 May 2012, playing the last 6 minutes in a 4–0 home win against DAC Dunajská Streda. His first Corgoň Liga goal came at the home win against Slovan Bratislava in the last match of the 2011-12 season.

Vysočina Jihlava
In summer 2013, he left from Tatran Prešov to Gambrinus Liga club Vysočina Jihlava.

Elana Toruń
Marcin's transfer to Elana was announced on 16 January 2020, along with the arrival of fellow countrymen Lukáš Hrnčiar.

References

External links
 1. FC Tatran Prešov profile 
 
 Eurofotbal.cz profile 
 Talent profile 

1994 births
Living people
Association football forwards
Slovak footballers
1. FC Tatran Prešov players
FC Vysočina Jihlava players
FK Dukla Banská Bystrica players
FK Železiarne Podbrezová players
Elana Toruń players
MFK Zemplín Michalovce players
Slovak Super Liga players
2. Liga (Slovakia) players
Czech First League players
II liga players
III liga players
Sportspeople from Prešov
Expatriate footballers in the Czech Republic
Expatriate footballers in Poland
Slovak expatriate sportspeople in the Czech Republic
Slovak expatriate sportspeople in Poland